"Call Me" is a song recorded by the German eurodance duo Le Click. The song was released in February 1997 as the second single from their album, Tonight is the Night. It peaked at number 35 in the United States and number 38 in the United Kingdom. It reached number-one on the RPM Dance chart in Canada and stayed there for three weeks.

Critical reception
Shawnee Smith, of Billboard magazine reviewed the song favorably, saying that singer Kayo Shekoni "oozes the right balance of pep and diva bombasity, while rapper Robert Haynes has his party chatter down pat."

Music video
The music video was directed by Thomas Job and premiered in March 1997.

Chart performance

Year-end charts

References

External links
 Full lyrics of this song at SongLyrics

Le Click songs
1997 singles
Songs written by Nosie Katzmann